The Cricket Match may refer to:

 The Cricket Match (novel),  a 1924 novel by Hugh de Sélincourt
 "The Cricket Match", an episode of the radio series Dad's Army remade as the TV episode "The Test"

See also
 Cricket, a bat-and-ball team sport